Pink knotweed is a common name for several plants in the knotweed family (Polygonaceae) and may refer to:

 Persicaria capitata, an ornamental plant native to Asia
 Polygonum pensylvanicum, a flowering plant native to North America